Tsinilla is a genus of moths belonging to the subfamily Olethreutinae of the family Tortricidae.

Species
Tsinilla albidecora Razowski & Wojtusiak, 2008
Tsinilla lineana (Fernald, 1901)
Tsinilla pallidipuncta Razowski & Wojtusiak, 2010
Tsinilla stenuncus Razowski & Wojtusiak, 2010
Tsinilla tristis Razowski & Wojtusiak, 2008
Tsinilla ubericolor Razowski & Wojtusiak, 2008
Tsinilla unciphrona Razowski & Wojtusiak, 2011

See also
List of Tortricidae genera

References

 , 1931, Proc. U.S. natn. Mus. 7914.
 ,2005 World Catalogue of Insects, 5
 , 2006, Monographs on Australian Lepidoptera Volume 10
 , 2010: Tortricidae (Lepidoptera) from Peru. Acta Zoologica Cracoviensia 53B (1-2): 73–159. . Full article: .
 , 2011: Tortricidae (Lepidoptera) from Colombia. Acta Zoologica Cracoviensia 54B (1-2): 103–128. Full article: .

External links
tortricidae.com

Olethreutini
Tortricidae genera